Bluebell Morning is an EP by Ooberman, released in May 2002 on the band's own Rotodisc label. The title track and "SnakeDance" were reworked and featured on the band's 2003 album Hey Petrunko.

Track listing
 "Bluebell Morning" (Popplewell/Flett)
 "Angel of Bradford" (Popplewell)
 "Souls of the Northern Lights" (Popplewell)
 "Miss U Miss" (Popplewell)
 "SnakeDance" (Popplewell)

External links 
 The Magic Treehouse – Ooberman fansite

2002 EPs